The Dashrathpuri metro station opened on 29 May 2018 for public on the Magenta Line of the Delhi Metro. Dashrath Puri is part of Phase III of Delhi Metro.

History

The station

Station layout

Entry/exit

Connections

Bus
Delhi Transport Corporation bus routes number 740A, 801, 803, 947, 947A, AC-RL-77, RL-77, serves the station from nearby Dashrath Puri bus stop.

See also

Delhi
Palam
Dashrath puri
List of Delhi Metro stations
Transport in Delhi
Delhi Metro Rail Corporation
Delhi Suburban Railway
Delhi Monorail
Indira Gandhi International Airport
Delhi Transport Corporation
South West Delhi
National Capital Region (India)
List of rapid transit systems
List of metro systems

References

External links

 Delhi Metro Rail Corporation Ltd. (Official site)
 Delhi Metro Annual Reports
 

Delhi Metro stations
Railway stations in West Delhi district